Joseph Gamache (born May 20, 1966) is an American boxing trainer and former professional boxer. He is the second boxer from Maine to capture a world boxing title, as he won the WBA super featherweight title in 1991 and the WBA lightweight title in 1992. He retired with a record of 55-4, with his losses being to Tony Lopez, Orzubek Nazarov, Julio César Chávez and Arturo Gatti.

Early years
At the age of 10, playing third base in Little League Baseball, Gamache tended to loop his throws to first base. His father suggested that if he worked out in a boxing gym he might strengthen his arms and straighten out his long throws across the infield. Gamache would come to love the rites of the gym and soon set aside baseball to become a boxer.

Professional boxing career
Gamache was trained by Tony Lampron and Teddy Atlas. He turned professional in 1987 and won his first 28 bouts.

Two-weight world champion
In 1991, Gamache defeated Jerry Ngobeni (19-1) to capture the vacant WBA super featherweight title. He vacated the title to move up to lightweight. The following year, Gamache defeated Chil-Sung Chun (18-1) to win the vacant WBA lightweight title. He lost the lightweight title in his first defense to Tony Lopez (40-3-1) via TKO in the eleventh round. Gamache fought bravely against the stronger, more experienced Lopez. In 1994, Gamache fought Orzubek Nazarov (19-0) for the WBA lightweight title, but lost via second-round TKO. He fought Julio César Chávez (96-2-1) in 1996. The referee stopped the fight at the end of the 8th round, giving Chávez a harder-than-expected victory.

Retirement
In his last fight on February 26, 2000, Gamache was brutally knocked out in two rounds by Arturo Gatti (30-4) at Madison Square Garden. Gamache went on to file lawsuits against both Gatti and the New York State Athletic Commission, alleging that Gatti weighed significantly more than the contracted weight at the time of the fight. A NYSAC official allowed Gatti off the scale before it could be determined that he had made the 141-pound weight limit. HBO said Gatti weighed 160 pounds on fight night compared to Gamache's 145 pounds. Gamache said he suffered brain damage as a result of the brutal knockout and was hospitalised for days. The case was tried and decided by Judge Melvin Schweitzer, who found the state negligent in its lax handling of the pre-fight weigh-in. Gamache was not awarded any damages, as Schweitzer was not convinced that the negligence was a substantial factor in causing Gamache's injury. Gamache considered the verdict a win as it acknowledged the NYSAC's negligence.

Training career
Gamache's son, Steven Gamache, made his professional debut in 2010. Today, Gamache works as a licensed boxing trainer, coaching some of the top fighters in the sport. He trained Boyd Melson, who won the gold medal at the 2004 World Military Boxing Championships in the 69 kg weight class and fought professionally at light middleweight until his retirement in 2016. Gamache was hired by Team Sauerland, and trained the Danish super middleweight contender Patrick Nielsen. Gamache is the current trainer of Swedish boxer Otto Wallin, who faced the former unified heavyweight world champion Tyson Fury on September 14, 2019.
He is also a member of the training team of Teofimo Lopez

References

External links 

|-

|-

|-

World boxing champions
World Boxing Association champions
World super-featherweight boxing champions
World lightweight boxing champions
Boxers from Maine
1966 births
Living people
Sportspeople from Lewiston, Maine
American male boxers